Corynabutilon is a genus of flowering plants in the family Malvaceae, native to southern Chile and Argentina. They are shrubs or small trees.

Species
Currently accepted species include:

Corynabutilon bicolor (Phil. ex K.Schum.) Kearney
Corynabutilon ceratocarpum (Hook. & Arn.) Kearney
Corynabutilon hirsutum (Phil.) A.Martic.
Corynabutilon ochsenii (Phil.) Kearney
Corynabutilon salicifolium (Reiche) Krapov.
Corynabutilon viride (Phil.) A.Martic.
Corynabutilon vitifolium (Cav.) Kearney

References

Malvaceae
Malvaceae genera